149 members were elected to local boards in the 2022 Auckland local board elections, an election held as part of the 2022 New Zealand local elections. Progress results were released on the 8 October. Preliminary results released on 9 October. Official and final results were released on 15 October.

Local board elections 

While many candidates were independents or stood for local parties, some stood for the centre-right Communities and Residents (C&R), the centre-left City Vision or the Labour Party. According to preliminary results, C&R had a successful election, gaining control of the Waitematā local board from City Vision and also picking up control of Puketāpapa. Meanwhile
Labour gained control of the Henderson-Massey local board. The hotly contested Albert-Eden local board remained deadlocked 4-4 between C&R and City Vision.

Waitematā Local Board (7)

Whau Local Board (7)

Rodney Local Board

Wellsford Subdivision (1)

Warkworth Subdivision (3)

Kumeū Subdivision (4)

Dairy Flat Subdivision (1)

Hibiscus and Bays Local Board

Hibiscus Coast Subdivision (4)

East Coast Bays Subdivision (4)

Upper Harbour Local Board (6)

Devonport-Takapuna Local Board (6)

Henderson-Massey Local Board (8)

Waitākere Ranges Local Board (6)

Albert-Eden Local Board

Maungawhau Subdivision (4)

Owairaka Subdivision (4)

Aotea/Great Barrier Local Board (5)

Waiheke Local Board (5)

Puketāpapa Local Board (6)

Ōrākei Local Board (7)

Maungakiekie-Tāmaki Local Board

Tāmaki Subdivision (4)

Maungakiekie Subdivision (3)

Howick Local Board

Botany Subdivision (3)

Howick Subdivision (3)

Pakuranga Subdivision (3)

Kaipātiki Local Board (8)

Māngere-Ōtāhuhu Local Board (7)

Ōtara-Papatoetoe Local Board

Papatoetoe Subdivision (4)

Ōtara Subdivision (3)

Franklin Local Board

Waiuku Subdivision (2)

Pukekohe Subdivision (4)

Wairoa Subdivision (3)

Manurewa Local Board (8)

Papakura Local Board (8)

See also
2022 New Zealand local elections
2022 Auckland local elections

References

Auckland
Auckland
Local elections 2013
2020s in Auckland